The Poppy Is Also a Flower is a 1966 American-French-Austrian made-for-television spy and anti-drug film. It was originally made under the auspices of the United Nations as part of a series of television specials designed to promote the organization's work. The film was directed by Terence Young and stars Yul Brynner, Omar Sharif, Eli Wallach, Angie Dickinson, Senta Berger, Stephen Boyd, Trevor Howard, Rita Hayworth and Marcello Mastroianni. Grace Kelly (as Princess Grace of Monaco) narrates.

The film was also known by alternative titles Poppies Are Also Flowers, The Opium Connection, and Danger Grows Wild (in the UK).

Plot 
In an attempt to stem the heroin trade at the Afghanistan–Iran border, a group of narcotics agents working for the United Nations inject a radioactive compound into a seized shipment of opium, in the hopes that it will lead them to the main heroin distributor in Europe.

Cast 
In alphabetical order

 Senta Berger as Maxine
 Stephen Boyd as Benson
 Yul Brynner as Col. Salem
 Angie Dickinson as Linda Benson
 Georges Géret as Supt. Roche
 Hugh Griffith as Tribal chief
 Jack Hawkins as Gen. Bahar
 Rita Hayworth as Monique Markos
 Trevor Howard as Sam Lincoln
 Trini López as himself
 E. G. Marshall as Coley
 Marcello Mastroianni as Insp. Mosca
 Amedeo Nazzari as Capt. Dinonnio
 Anthony Quayle as Capt. Vanderbilt
 Gilbert Roland as Serge Markos
 Harold Sakata as Martin
 Omar Sharif as Dr. Rad
 Barry Sullivan as Chasen
 Nadja Tiller as Dr. Bronovska
 Eli Wallach as "Happy" Locarno

International crew 
Part of the production of this film took place overseas. Iran was the main scene for many desert and border scenes. The crew spent several weeks on location and the local cinematographers joined the team to accomplish the production. Famous Iranian cinematographers cooperated with this project, including Maziyar Partow.

Production 
The film is based on an idea by Ian Fleming, the James Bond creator. Funded in part by a grant from Xerox, it was produced by the United Nations and the stars received a salary of $1. Terence Young left the direction of Thunderball to make the film.

The Poppy Is Also a Flower was the last of four television movies commissioned by the United Nations, to publicise its missions and roles in world peace and diplomacy. The film was originally 80 minutes in length for its ABC telecast, minus commercial time for the 90-minute slot. It was expanded to 100 minutes for a US theatrical release by Astral Films in 1967.

After its television broadcast on ABC in 1966, Eli Wallach won an Emmy Award for Best Supporting Actor, for his portrayal of drug kingpin "Happy" Locarno. This was the production's only award.

See also 
 List of American films of 1966
 List of television films produced for American Broadcasting Company
 United Nations television film series

References

External links 
 
 
 CommanderBond.net: "Ian Fleming's Last Story: 'The Poppy Is Also a Flower'"
 TVParty: "The UN Goes to the Movies"

1966 films
1960s spy drama films
American spy drama films
American television films
Drug rehabilitation
1960s English-language films
Films about the illegal drug trade
Films about the United Nations
Films directed by Terence Young
Films set in Iran
Films set in Italy
Films set in Monaco
Films with screenplays by Ian Fleming
Xerox
1960s American films